Isabelle Devaluez (born 17 March 1966 in Grenoble, Isère) is a retired female discus thrower from France, who competed in the discus contest at the 1996 Summer Olympics in Atlanta, Georgia. There she ended up in 37th place (55.08 metres). Devaluez set her personal best in the women's discus throw event (62.02 metres) on 15 June 1996 in La Garde. She was the bronze medallist in the discus at the 1997 Mediterranean Games.

Achievements

References

sports-reference

1966 births
Living people
French female discus throwers
Olympic athletes of France
Athletes (track and field) at the 1996 Summer Olympics
Sportspeople from Grenoble
Mediterranean Games bronze medalists for France
Mediterranean Games medalists in athletics
Athletes (track and field) at the 1997 Mediterranean Games